Holly Dale (born December 23, 1953) is a Canadian filmmaker and television director. Over the course of her career, Dale has worked in the Canadian film and television industry as a director, producer, writer, and editor. Although she has completed solo projects, the majority of Dale's work has been in collaboration with her former classmate, Janis Cole. The Thin Line (1977), P4W: Prison for Women (1981), and Hookers on Davie (1984) are some of their most recognized projects. Dale's work has been featured in festivals around the world including North America, Europe, and Australia. She has also received award nominations and wins, including a Gemini Award in 1982 for the Best Theatrical Documentary for P4W: Prison for Women.

Early life and education 
Dale was raised in a low-income household in Toronto, Ontario. However, she decided to leave home as a teenager due to ongoing family conflict. During this time, she worked in non-therapeutic massage parlors in downtown Toronto. In the mid-1970s, Dale was accepted into the film studies program at Sheridan College in Oakville, Ontario. Here, she met Janis Cole, who she would continue to work with for the next 20 years.

Career

Early career 
Often working with a low budget, Dale began her film career as an independent documentary maker. Sharing the responsibilities of writing, directing, producing, and editing with Cole, the two women focused on showcasing social inequalities and hardships experienced by marginalized groups. Their choice to question and challenge class-based oppression and gender norms in their work prompted their reputation as feminist filmmakers.

Short and feature films 
As students, Dale and Cole completed their first short film, Cream Soda, in 1976. This documentary revealed the demands on women employed in Toronto-based body-rub parlors. Meanwhile, their next film, Minimum Charge No Cover (1976), explored the lived experience of homosexuals, drag queens, sex workers, and substance users.

Their following short, The Thin Line (1977), documented the day to day lives of people who were deemed criminally insane and institutionalized in a maximum-security prison. While shooting this film, Dale and Cole admit they sought to emphasize the prisoners' humanity to provoke a sense of commonality with the audience, as opposed to solely focusing on their misconduct.

The content from this film motivated Dale and Cole's first feature documentary, P4W: Prison for Women (1981). After four years of communicating with officials, Dale and Cole were granted permission to film inside an all-woman prison outside of Kingston, Ontario, Canada. This marked the beginning of the documentary P4W: Prison for Women (1981). As co-directors and co-producers, Dale and Cole focused on the relationships between inmates as well as the prisoners' willingness to live despite ongoing challenges. This film was well received by critics and the public alike, winning several awards at film festivals and a Genie Award in 1982.

Later career 
Later in their careers, Dale and Cole decided to develop and operate the Toronto-based independent production company called Spectrum Films.

In addition to her career in film, Dale has directed and produced episodes of different Canadian television series, including Bliss, Sue Thomas: F.B. Eye, Just Cause, Twice in a Lifetime, Durham County, Cold Case, and Being Erica. She has also directed two episodes of NCIS: Season 11's "Alibi" and Season 12's "Status Update".

Filmography

Director

Producer
Thin Line (co-produced with Janis Cole) (1977)
Starship Invasions (1977; assistant producer)
Plague (1978)
P4W: Prison for Women (co-produced with Janis Cole) (1981)
Hookers on Davie (co-produced with Janis Cole) (1984)
Calling the Shots (co-produced with Janis Cole) (1988)

Awards and nominations

See also
 List of female film and television directors
 List of lesbian filmmakers
 List of LGBT-related films directed by women

References

Further reading

External links 
 
 
 Spectrum Films website
 Holly Dale at Canadian Filmmakers Distribution Centre
 Holly Dale at Film Reference
  Holly Dale at Queer Media Database Canada-Québec

1953 births
Living people
Canadian documentary film directors
Canadian documentary film producers
Canadian film editors
Canadian television directors
Screenwriters from Ontario
Canadian women film directors
Canadian women film producers
Film producers from Ontario
Canadian women screenwriters
Canadian casting directors
Women casting directors
LGBT film directors
LGBT film producers
Canadian LGBT screenwriters
Canadian women film editors
Canadian women television directors
Film directors from Toronto
Writers from Toronto
Canadian Film Centre alumni
Directors of Genie and Canadian Screen Award winners for Best Documentary Film
LGBT television directors
Canadian women documentary filmmakers